The 1998 California Golden Bears football team was an American football team that represented the University of California, Berkeley in the Pacific-10 Conference (Pac-10) during the 1998 NCAA Division I-A football season. In their second year under head coach Tom Holmoe, the Golden Bears compiled a 5–6 record (3–5 against Pac-10 opponents), finished in seventh place in the Pac-10, and were outscored by their opponents by a combined score of 251 to 183.

The team's statistical leaders included Justin Vedder with 2,322 passing yards, Marcus Fields with 734 rushing yards, and Dameane Douglas with 1,150 receiving yards.

Schedule

Roster

References

California
California Golden Bears football seasons
California Golden Bears football